Senegalese passports are issued to Senegalese citizens to travel outside Senegal.

Physical properties
 Surname
 Given names
 Nationality Senegalese
 Date of birth 
 Sex  
 Place of birth  
 Date of Expiry 
 Passport number

Languages

The data page/information page is printed in French and English.

See also 
 ECOWAS passports
 List of passports
 Visa requirements for Senegalese citizens

References

Passports by country
Government of Senegal